Eremolaena darainensis is a tree in the family Sarcolaenaceae. It is endemic to Madagascar. It is named for its native commune of Daraina.

Description
Its branches are red to gray brown and lenticellate. The bark is smooth. They are green above and white below. The flowers are solitary with five green sepals and five white petals. Fruits are unknown.

Distribution and habitat
Eremolaena darainensis is known only from the northern region of Sava.

Threats
Eremolaena darainensis is currently known only from five subpopulations in Loky-Manambato forest. The species is only temporarily protected so further habitat decline is likely. The species' conservation status is assessed as endangered.

References

Sarcolaenaceae
Endemic flora of Madagascar
Trees of Madagascar
Plants described in 2014
Flora of the Madagascar dry deciduous forests